Latourell is an unincorporated community located in Multnomah County, Oregon, United States, on the Historic Columbia River Highway about eight miles (13 km) east of Troutdale and 5.5 miles (9 km) west of Multnomah Falls.  Compared to its peak in the 1880s, it is now virtually a ghost town.

History 
Latourell Falls and the town of Latourell were named for Joseph "Frenchy" Latourell who immigrated to Oregon in the 1850s.  Latourell owned a mercantile and a fish wheel, and he was a boatman on the Columbia River.

The first post office in the area was called Rooster Rock after the natural feature; it was established in May 1876. Joseph Latourell became postmaster in August 1876, and the name of the post office was changed to Latourell Falls a year later. The office closed in 1964. The name of the local railroad station was "Latourell".

The falls are on property formerly owned by Guy W. Talbot and now part of Guy W. Talbot State Park. Latourell Prairie, on the bluffs above the river and east of the falls, is also named for Joseph Latourell.

The Latourells had eight children and were known to Portlanders who visited by steamboat to sing, dance, dine and listen while the family played musical instruments.

At its height, Latourell was a working timber town and had five saloons and a well-known brass band.  Large scale commercial logging did not arrive until the 1880s.  Before that, many Columbia River Gorge residents cut and delivered cordwood to Columbia River steamships.

See also
List of ghost towns in Oregon

References 

 Information sign at Guy W. Talbot State Park

Columbia River Gorge
Ghost towns in Oregon
Historic Columbia River Highway
Unincorporated communities in Multnomah County, Oregon
1876 establishments in Oregon
Populated places established in 1876
Unincorporated communities in Oregon